Domenico Gualdi (born 30 April 1974) is an Italian former professional racing cyclist. He rode in three editions of the Giro d'Italia.

References

External links
 

1974 births
Living people
Italian male cyclists
Sportspeople from Trentino
Cyclists from Trentino-Alto Adige/Südtirol